Qaleh-ye Aqa Hasan (also Romanized as Qal‘eh-ye Āqā Ḩasān, Qal‘eh Āqa Ḩasan, and Qal’eh-e-Āqā Hasan; also known as Āqā Ḩasan) is a village in Soleyman Rural District, Soleyman District, Zaveh County, Razavi Khorasan Province, Iran. At the 2006 census, its population was 3,183, in 748 families.

References 

Populated places in Zaveh County